Gisela Agnes of Anhalt-Köthen (21 September 1722, Köthen – 20 April 1751, Dessau) was a princess of Anhalt-Köthen by birth and by marriage Duchess of Anhalt-Dessau.

Life 
Gisela Agnes was the only surviving child of Prince Leopold of Anhalt-Köthen (1694–1728) from his first marriage to Friederike Henriette (1702–1723), daughter of Prince Charles Frederick of Anhalt-Bernburg.

When her father died without leaving a male heir, he was succeeded as Prince of Anhalt-Köthen by her uncle Augustus Louis of Anhalt-Köthen.  However, Gisela Agnes claimed her allodial title and took the case to the Reichskammergericht. Prince John Augustus of Anhalt-Zerbst mediated and a compromise was reached.  Gisela was compensated with a sum of  plus and annual pension until her marriage.  She also received her father's collection of guns and coins and another  for the estates of Prosigk, Klepzig and Köthen.

She married on 25 May 1737 in Bernburg her cousin, Prince Leopold II Maximilian of Anhalt-Dessau (1700–1751).  The marriage was described as very happy. The death of his wife hit Leopold II so hard that he, already in delicate health, died only eight months later. She was buried in the St. Mary's Church in Dessau.

Issue 
From her marriage with Leopold II Maximilian, Gisela Agnes had the following children:
 Leopold III Frederick Francis (1740–1817), Prince of Anhalt-Dessau
 married in 1767 princess Henriette Louise of Brandenburg-Schwedt (1750–1811)
 Louise (1742–1743)
 Henriette Catherine Agnes (1744–1799)
 married in 1779 with Baron John Jost of Loën (1737–1803)
 John George (1748–1811)
 Maria Leopoldine (1749–1769)
 married 1765 Prince Simon August of Lippe-Detmold (1727–1782)
 Casimire (1749–1778)
 married in 1769 the Prince Simon August of Lippe-Detmold (1727–1782), the widow of her sister Maria Leopoldine
 Albert Frederick (1750–1811)
 married in 1774 Countess Henriette of Lippe-Weissenfeld (1753–1795)

References and sources 
 Ferdinand Siebigk: Das Herzogthum Anhalt, Desbarats, 1867, p. 227 ff.
 Gerhard Heine: Geschichte des Landes Anhalt und seiner Fürsten, Heine, 1866, p. 186

House of Ascania
German duchesses
German princesses
1722 births
1751 deaths
18th-century German people
Royal reburials
Daughters of monarchs